A. H. S. Ataul Karim (died 29 July 2010) was a Bangladesh diplomat, foreign secretary, and former Ambassador of Bangladesh to the United States. He is a former Permanent Representative of Bangladesh to the United Nations.

Career 
Karim served as the chairperson of a meeting of foreign secretaries of South Asian Association for Regional Cooperation countries from 28 March to 30 March 1983.

In 1986, Karim served as the Permanent Representative of Bangladesh to the United Nations in Geneva.

On 16 August 1988, Karim was appointed the Permanent Representative of Bangladesh to the United Nations.

In 1991, Karim was appointed the head of the United Nations Mission in Cambodia, UN Advance Mission in Cambodia (UNAMIC), and Chief Liaison Officer. Before that he was working as the Ambassador of Bangladesh to the United States.

Death 
Karim died on 29 July 2010 at the Japan-Bangladesh Friendship Hospital, Dhaka, Bangladesh from lung cancer.

References 

Year of birth missing
2010 deaths
Bangladeshi diplomats
Ambassadors of Bangladesh to the United States
Foreign Secretaries of Bangladesh
Deaths from cancer in Bangladesh
Permanent Representatives of Bangladesh to the United Nations